Anthoine Lussier (born 8 February 1983 in Bonneville) is a professional French ice hockey player who participated at the 2010 IIHF World Championship as a member of the France National men's ice hockey team.

References

Living people
French ice hockey forwards
1983 births
People from Bonneville, Haute-Savoie
Sportspeople from Haute-Savoie